Mary Howard may refer to:

Maria Howard, Duchess of Norfolk (c.1693–1754), British noblewoman, known as Mary
Mary FitzRoy, Duchess of Richmond and Somerset (1519–1557), née Lady Mary Howard, lady-in-waiting, wife of Henry Fitzroy, daughter of the 3rd Duke of Norfolk and daughter-in-law of Henry VIII
Mary FitzAlan (1541–1557), Duchess of Norfolk, whose married name was Mary Howard
Mary Howard, of the Holy Cross (1653–1735), English nun
Mary Howard, Duchess of Norfolk (died 1705) (c. 1659–1705), British peer
Mary Howard, Duchess of Norfolk (died 1773) (c. 1712–1773), British noblewoman after whom Norfolk Island was named
Mary Howard, pseudonym of American politician Mary E. Woolley Chamberlain (1870–1953)
Mary Howard (novelist) (1907–1991), British romantic novelist
Mary Howard de Liagre (1913–2009), American actress usually credited as Mary Howard
Mary Howard, fictional character in the 1941 film When Ladies Meet
Mary Shipman Howard (1911–1976), recording engineer and recording studio owner